Cerberilla longicirrha is a species of sea slug, an aeolid nudibranch, a marine heterobranch mollusc in the family Aeolidiidae. It is the type species of the genus Cerberilla.

Distribution
This species was described from  the Indo-Pacific region.

Description
All Cerberilla species have a broad foot and the cerata are numerous, arranged in transverse rows across the body.

Ecology 
Species of Cerberilla live on and in sandy substrates where they burrow beneath the surface and feed on burrowing sea anemones.

References

Aeolidiidae
Gastropods described in 1873